Clothes Make the Man is a 1940 German historical comedy film directed by Helmut Käutner and starring Heinz Rühmann, Hertha Feiler and Hilde Sessak. The film is based on the Novella Kleider machen Leute, published by realist author Gottfried Keller in 1874. It was shot at the Barrandov Studios in German-occupied Prague as well as at the Babelsberg and Tempelhof Studios in Berlin.

Cast

Release
The film was released in the USA only in 1958, in German but with no subtitles.

Reception
Thomas Kramer of the Reclams Lexikon of the German Films

References

External links

Films of Nazi Germany
Films directed by Helmut Käutner
Films based on Swiss novels
Films based on works by Gottfried Keller
Films set in the 1830s
Films about con artists
1940s historical comedy films
German historical comedy films
Films shot at Barrandov Studios
Films shot at Babelsberg Studios
Films shot at Tempelhof Studios
Terra Film films
German black-and-white films
1940s German-language films
1940s German films